Season one of the 2011 edition of El Gran Show premiered on April 14, 2011.

This season, the "public's favorite couple" was not realized more in the program. In addition, the "lifeguard" was added, a special wildcard that the judges could use to save one of the eliminated couples.

On July 23, 2011, Raúl Zuazo and Dayana Calla were crowned champions, Leslie Shaw and Kevin Ubillus finished second, while Vanessa Terkes and Andy Sandoval finished third.

Cast

Couples
The celebrities appeared at a press conference on May 2, 2011, this season featured only eight celebrities unlike past seasons.

In the first three weeks, the competition was between teams formed by two heroes and four dreamers with a respective choreographer, representing different regions of Peru. In each week, the team with the lowest score was sentenced and one of their dreamers was eliminated, determined by the individual vote of each of the team members. From the fourth week, each hero danced with only one dreamer of his team forming eight couples. Due to the drastic change, since of the remaining 14 dreamers six of them were eliminated, the production decided to call them for the next season.

Host and judges
Gisela Valcárcel, Aldo Díaz and Cristian Rivero returned as hosts, while Morella Petrozzi, Carlos Alcántara, Pachi Valle Riestra and the VIP Jury returned as judges. Stuart Bishop, who served as a judge for the previous two seasons, did not return

Scoring charts

Red numbers indicate the sentenced for each week
Green numbers indicate the best steps for each week
 the couple was eliminated that week
 the couple was safe in the duel
 the couple was eliminated that week and safe with a lifeguard
 the winning couple
 the runner-up couple
 the third-place couple

Average score chart
This table only counts dances scored on a 40-point scale.

Highest and lowest scoring performances
The best and worst performances in each dance according to the judges' 40-point scale are as follows:

Couples' highest and lowest scoring dances
Scores are based upon a potential 40-point maximum.

Weekly scores 
Individual judges' scores in the charts below (given in parentheses) are listed in this order from left to right: Morella Petrozzi, Carlos Alcántara, Pachi Valle Riestra, VIP Jury.

Week 1: First Dances 
The teams danced jazz or reggaeton and a partner dance, formed by a hero and a dreamer, being the obtained scores added to the one of their respective teams.

Team Lima was sentenced, passing to the elimination vote and being eliminated the dreamer Alberto Arteaga.
Running order

Week 2: Party Night 
The teams performed one unlearned dance and a partner dance, formed by a hero and a dreamer,

Team Trujillo was sentenced, passing to the elimination vote and being eliminated the dreamer Wendy Gutiérrez. 
Running order

Week 3: Jazz & Merengue 
The teams danced jazz and a partner dance, formed by a hero and a dreamer. In the versus, the heroes of each team faced each other in couples dancing pachanga.

Team Lima was sentenced, passing to the elimination vote and being eliminated the dreamer Gloria Cerdán, but the judges decided to save her with one of the lifeguards.
Running order

Week 4: Disco & Salsa 
The couples danced disco or salsa. In the versus, they faced couples formed by the heroes dancing latin pop.
Running order

Week 5: Guaracha & Merengue 
The couples (except those sentenced) danced guaracha or merengue. In the versus, they faced couples formed by the heroes dancing rock and roll.
Running order

*The duel
Kukín & Victoria: Eliminated
Leysi & Eder: Safe

Week 6: Cumbia/Pop 
Individual judges' scores in the charts below (given in parentheses) are listed in this order from left to right: Morella Petrozzi, Carlos Alcántara, Vania Masías, VIP Jury.

The couples danced cumbia (except those sentenced), pop and a danceathon of salsa.
Running order

*The duel
Leysi & Eder: Eliminated
Mónica & Edson: Safe

Week 7: Pachanga/World Dances 
The couples danced pachanga (except those sentenced), the world dances and a danceathon of cumbia.
Running order

*The duel
Mario & Diana: Eliminated (but safe with the lifeguard)
Aldo & Isabel: Safe

Week 8: Hip-Hop/Axé Under the Rain 
Individual judges' scores in the charts below (given in parentheses) are listed in this order from left to right: Morella Petrozzi, Carlos Alcántara, Pachi Valle Riestra, VIP Jury.

The couples danced hip-hop (except those sentenced), axé under the rain and a danceathon of cumbia.
Running order

*The duel
Vanessa & Andy: Eliminated (but safe with the lifeguard)
Mario & Diana: Safe

Week 9: Quarterfinals 
The couples danced tex-mex (except those sentenced), strip dance under the rain, a team dance of jazz and a danceathon of merengue.
Running order

*The duel
Mónica & Edson: Eliminated
Aldo & Isabel: Safe

Week 10: Semifinals 
Individual judges' scores in the chart below (given in parentheses) are listed in this order from left to right: Morella Petrozzi, Johanna San Miguel, Pachi Valle Riestra, VIP Jury.

The couples danced salsa (except those sentenced), adagio, a team dance of marinera and a danceathon of pachanga.

Due to a failure in the telephone calls, it was decided that the duel was canceled and the sentenced couples saved.
Running order

Week 11: Finals 
Individual judges' scores in the charts below (given in parentheses) are listed in this order from left to right: Morella Petrozzi, Carlos Alcántara, Pachi Valle Riestra, VIP Jury.

On the first part, the couples danced a mix (mambo/latin pop/quebradita) (except those sentenced) and a freestyle.

On the second part, the final four couples danced quickstep.
Running order (Part 1)

Running order (Part 2)

Dance chart
The celebrities and their dreamers will dance one of these routines for each corresponding week:
 Week 1, 2 & 3: Teams stage
 Week 4: Disco, salsa & the versus (Disco & Timba)
 Week 5: Guaracha, merengue & the versus (Guaracha & Merengue)
 Week 6: Cumbia, pop  & the danceathon (Cumbia/Pop)
 Week 7: Pachanga, one unlearned dance & the danceathon (Pachanga/World Dances)
 Week 8: Hip-Hop, axé under the rain & the danceathon (Hip-Hop/Axé Under the Rain)
 Week 9: Tex-mex, strip dance under the rain, team dances & the danceathon (Quarterfinals)
 Week 10: Salsa, adagio, team dances & the danceathon (Semifinals)
 Week 11: Mix (mambo/latin pop/quebradita), freestyle, quickstep (Finals)

 Highest scoring dance
 Lowest scoring dance
 Gained bonus points for winning this dance
 Gained no bonus points for losing this dance
In italic indicate the dances performed in the duel

Notes

References

External links

El Gran Show
2011 Peruvian television seasons
Reality television articles with incorrect naming style